Tan Sri Zainal Abidin bin Ahmad (16 September 1895 – 23 October 1973) or better known by the moniker Za'aba (alternatively spelled Za'ba), was a Malaysian writer and linguist. He modernised the Malay language with the publication of a series of grammar books entitled Pelita Bahasa in 1936 at the Sultan Idris Training College. The book contained guidelines in modernising the structure of classical Malay language, transforming it into the Malay language that is in use today. The most significant change was the switch from the conventional passive to the modern active form of syntax.

He also devised the Za'aba Spelling system for Malay, which was adopted as the official orthography of Malay in Malaya and continued to be used by its successor states Malaysia, Singapore and Brunei until 1972, when it was replaced by New Rumi Spelling.

Biography

Zainal Abidin was born on 16 September 1895 in Kampung Bukit Kerdas, Batu Kikir, Jempol in the state of Negeri Sembilan; the eldest of three children. His mother, Intan Awaluddin (1877–1907) was of Minangkabau descent, while his father Ahmad Ibrahim (1862–1927) was a Buginese from a well-off family in the Riau Islands — the latter being the only literate person in the village. Zainal Abidin, however, learned to read and write by himself from the age of five, practising his writing on young banana leaves with a twig as a stylus. This caught the interest of his father, who decided to buy him a writing slate and some chalk. This further motivated Zainal's affinity for writing and helped to finetune his writing skills later on.

Za'aba initially received his early education at a Malay school in Batu Kikir at the age of 12. His academic excellence allowed him to advance by two grades to Year 3. His father transferred him to a nearby school in Linggi in 1909, in the hopes that his son would become an ulama and learn the fields of Arabic language and Islamic jurisprudence, among other things. He then continued his study at St. Paul's Institution, Seremban, becoming the first Malay to take and pass the Senior Cambridge test in 1915.

Za'aba started his career as a teacher at:
 1916: English College Johore Bahru
 1918: Malay College Kuala Kangsar
 1923: Education Department, Kuala Lumpur
 1924: Maktab Perguruan Sultan Idris, Tanjung Malim
 1939: Information Department, Singapore until 1942
 1942: School of Oriental and African Studies, University of London until 1951
 1954: University of Malaya, Singapore until 1959.

Za'aba loved reading and had a highly commendable talent in writing, with most of his writings published in local newspapers and magazines. He published a series of monographs in regard to the Malay language, including Pelita Bahasa and Ilmu Mengarang Melayu. His other writings include a compilation of translated Shakespeare works, Cerita-Cerita Shakespeare, that was published by Percetakan Gudang Chap in Singapore.

Za'aba wrote a lot of essays that were social criticisms against the ills affecting contemporary Malay society and against British colonial rule at the time. His hidden hand had a role in the formation of the United Malays National Organisation, a political party that had played an influential role in Malaysian politics and was one of the ruling parties in the country until the 14th General Election on May 9, 2018, when UMNO lost to the opposition, Pakatan Harapan, led by former 4th Prime Minister Tun Dr Mahathir Mohamad.

Awards and recognitions

Honour of Malaya
  : 
 Commander of the Order of the Defender of the Realm (PMN) – Tan Sri (1962)

Places named after him
Several places were named after him, including:
 Kolej Pendeta Za'ba, a residential college at Universiti Kebangsaan Malaysia in Bangi, Selangor
 Kolej Pendeta Za'ba, a residential college at Universiti Putra Malaysia in Serdang, Selangor
 Kolej Za'ba, a residential college at Universiti Pendidikan Sultan Idris in Tanjung Malim, Perak
 Za'ba Residential College, a residential college at University of Malaya, Kuala Lumpur

References

Minangkabau people
Malaysian people of Minangkabau descent
Malaysian people of Bugis descent
Malaysian people of Malay descent
Malaysian Muslims
Malaysian politicians
Malaysian writers
1895 births
1973 deaths
Linguists of Malay
Malaysian essayists
People from Negeri Sembilan
Commanders of the Order of the Defender of the Realm
20th-century essayists
Sultan Idris Education University alumni